Marc Albrecht (born 1964) is a German conductor who lives in The Netherlands. He was chief conductor of the Dutch National Opera, the Netherlands Chamber Orchestra, and the Netherlands Philharmonic Orchestra from 2009 to 2020.

Biography
Born in Hanover, Lower Saxony, West Germany, Albrecht is the son of the conductor George Alexander Albrecht and Corinne Albrecht, formerly a ballet dancer who became a physiotherapist. He is a first cousin of Ursula von der Leyen (née Albrecht). Albrecht studied music with his father. Albrecht has served as an assistant to Claudio Abbado with the Gustav Mahler Jugendorchester, and an assistant conductor to Gerd Albrecht (no relation) at the Hamburg State Opera.

From 1995 to 2001, Albrecht was music director of the Staatstheater Darmstadt.  From 2001 to 2004, he was first guest conductor with the Deutsche Oper Berlin.  He became artistic adviser of the Orchestre philharmonique de Strasbourg (Strasbourg Philharmonic Orchestra) in 2005, and music director in 2008.  With the Strasbourg Philharmonic, he has conducted commercial recordings for the Pentatone label, including orchestral lieder of Alban Berg and piano concertos by Robert Schumann and Antonín Dvořák.  He concluded his Strasbourg tenure in 2011.

Albrecht made his first conducting appearance at the Dutch National Opera in September 2008 with Die Frau ohne Schatten. In March 2009, he was named chief conductor of the Netherlands Chamber Orchestra, Netherlands Philharmonic Orchestra, and Dutch National Opera, effective with the 2011-2012 season.  His initial contract was for four years.  In May 2016, the orchestra announced the extension of Albrecht's contract through the 2019-2020 season.  He stood down from all three of these chief conductorships at the end of the 2019-2020 season.  He has led commercial recordings with the Netherlands Philharmonic and the Netherlands Opera for the Pentatone label.

Albrecht maintains a residence in Amsterdam.  His wife is an opera singer, and the couple have a son.

Selected discography
 Richard Strauss - Tone Poems. Marc Albrecht, Orchestre Philharmonique de Strasbourg. PENTATONE PTC 5186310 (2008).
 Alban Berg - Orchestral Pieces and Lieder. Christiane Iven, Marc Albrecht, Orchestre Philharmonique de Strasbourg. PENTATONE PTC 5186363 (2009).
 Schumann & Dvořák - Piano Concertos. Marc Albrecht, Martin Helmchen, Orchestre Philharmonique de Strasbourg. PENTATONE PTC 5186333 (2009).
 Dukas - L'apprenti sorcier / Ravel - Ma mère l'Oye / Koechlin - Les Bandar-log. Marc Albrecht, Orchestre Philharmonique de Strasbourg. PENTATONE PTC 5186336 (2010).
 Korngold - Symphony in F sharp, Op.40; Much Ado About nothing, Op.11. Marc Albrecht, Orchestre Philharmonique de Strasbourg. PENTATONE PTC 5186373 (2010).
 Mahler - The Song of the Earth. Marc Albrecht, Alice Coote, Burkhard Fritz, Netherlands Philharmonic Orchestra. PENTATONE PTC 5186502 (2013).
 Brahms (orch. Schoenberg) Piano Quartet, Op. 25, Schoenberg - Begleitmusik zu einer Lichtspielszene. Marc Albrecht, Netherlands Philharmonic Orchestra. PENTATONE PTC 5186398 (2015)
 Mahler - Symphony No. 4. Marc Albrecht, Elizabeth Watts, Netherlands Philharmonic Orchestra. PENTATONE PTC 5186487 (2015).
 Mahler - Song Cycles. Marc Albrecht, Alice Coote, Netherlands Philharmonic Orchestra. PENTATONE PTC 5186576 (2017).
Richard Strauss - Burleske/Ein Heldenleben. Marc Albrecht, Denis Kozhukhin, Netherlands Philharmonic Orchestra. PENTATONE PTC 5186617 (2018).
Zemlinsky - Die Seejungfrau. Marc Albrecht, Netherlands Philharmonic Orchestra. PENTATONE PTC 5186740 (2020).

References

External links
 Konzertdirektion Schmid agency biography of Marc Albrecht
 Klassik Heute, German-language biography
 Musikverein Darmstadt German-language timeline history page
 Dresden Philharmonic Philharmonische Blätter, "Der Dirigent Marc Albrecht im Porträt", July-August 2010 (German language article)

1964 births
German male conductors (music)
Living people
21st-century German conductors (music)
21st-century German male musicians
Albrecht family